The 2005 Nottinghamshire County Council election was held on Thursday, 5 May 2005. The whole council was up for election and the result was the Labour Party retaining its control of the council.

Boundary changes to the electoral divisions took effect at this election, with the number of seats increased by four.

Results by division
Each electoral division returned either one, two or three county councillors. The candidates elected to the council in each electoral division are shown in the table below. "Unopposed" indicates that the councillor was elected unopposed.

References

2005
2005 English local elections
2000s in Nottinghamshire